The Nikon F4 is a 35 mm autofocus (AF) single lens reflex (SLR) film camera, introduced in 1988 as the next generation in Nikon's line of F series professional cameras. With industrial design by Giorgetto Giugiaro, the F4 was the first professional Nikon to feature a practical autofocus system.  The F4 is able to accept any of Nikon's manual focus (MF) or AF lenses from 1959 to the present day, including the two F3AF lenses (in Autofocus mode). The F4 succeeded the F3, a manual focus camera introduced in 1980 but outlasted the F4 as it stayed in production until 2001. Nikon introduced its next flagship model, the F5, in 1996. All F4 models were discontinued soon after, in May 1997.

Features
The F4 introduced many Nikon owners to autofocus (as well as focus tracking), and was the first professional Nikon to utilize a vertical-travel metal-blade shutter (with shutter balancer to minimize noise and camera bounce). The shutter was a further developed Copal Square. As a fully electronic camera with motorized film transport (up to 5.7 frames per second), it required one of three available bottom-mounted battery packs to operate, using standard AA or rechargeable cells. For the first time on a Nikon SLR, two of those battery packs also offered an additional vertical shutter release button and grip for using the camera vertically.

Its controls were transitional between those of mechanical SLRs and future professional film and digital SLRs: the F4's electronics, LCD viewfinder display, autofocus, programmed auto-exposure, and matrix meter looked to the future, but it also retained classic dedicated analog dials for shutter speed, lens aperture, metering pattern, and exposure compensation.

The F4 was the first Nikon F-series lacking a manual film-advance lever, though it offered both motor-driven and manual film rewinding. Like previous F-series cameras, the F4 featured a high degree of customization to specific tasks, with various remote controls, film backs, and viewfinders available. While it was a complex camera with over 1700 parts, the F4's high-quality mechanical and electronic components, as well as weather sealing and tough construction, made for a reliable and long-lived professional SLR.

Lens compatibility

The F4 will accept all autofocus lenses made for the F mount, as well all manual focus F mount lenses including very early invasive fisheye lenses. The meter coupling cam can be moved out of the way for use with lenses manufactured prior to 1977 (non-AI lenses). The F4 is one of the three film based Nikon cameras offering full Matrix metering with AI manual focus lenses.

Its lack of electronic aperture control limits the F4's functionality with G type lenses, which do not have an aperture ring. With these lenses, exposure control is limited to program and shutter-priority modes. In addition, DX lenses are not designed to cover the full 35mm frame and will vignette when used with the F4 (or any other 35mm camera). The F4 also provides no support for Nikon's later VR (Vibration Reduction) system; VR-equipped lenses will mount and function, but without image stabilization.

Model line
Eventually Nikon had three F4 models that were distinguished by which integrated battery pack was attached. All F4 bodies are interchangeable with all battery packs. Therefore, none of the cameras includes a label for its particular model name—all use a simple "F4" nameplate:

Nikon NASA F4

The Nikon NASA F4 Electronic Still Camera was one of the first and rarest fully digital cameras. Constructed for NASA, it was used since 1991 on board the Space Shuttle. The camera was based on a modified F4 with standard F-mount and had a digital camera back with a monochrome CCD image sensor with 1024 x 1024 pixels on an area of 15 x 15mm.

References

General references
 Nikon Corp (2005). "History." Retrieved May 1, 2005.
 Foo, Leo (2001). "Nikon F4 Series SLR models – Index Page." Retrieved May 1, 2005.
 Gandy, Stephen (August 8, 2004). "Nikon SLR Guide." Retrieved May 1, 2005.
 Wall, John N. "The Nikon F4 FAQ (Version 6.0)." Retrieved April 24, 2009.

External links

 Debut of the Nikon F4, by Nikon

Products introduced in 1988
F004
F004